École internationale du papier, de la communication imprimée et des biomatériaux (Pagora) a French engineering College created in 1907.

The school trains future executives in sectors related to paper, printing, packaging and the environment.

Located in Grenoble, Pagora is a public higher education institution. The school is a member of the Grenoble Institute of Technology.

References

External links
 Pagora

Engineering universities and colleges in France
Grenoble
Pagora
Educational institutions established in 1907
1907 establishments in France